Piletocera hecate is a moth in the family Crambidae. It was described by Arthur Gardiner Butler in 1886. It is found on Tonga.

References

hecate
Moths described in 1886
Moths of Oceania